Gregory Everett "Greg" Proops (born October 3, 1959) is an American actor, stand-up comedian and television host. He is widely known for his  guest appearances on the U.K. and U.S. versions of Whose Line Is It Anyway?. He has also voiced the titular character on the U.S. version of Bob the Builder.

Early life
Proops was born in Phoenix, Arizona, and raised in San Carlos, California, a suburb south of San Francisco, attending San Carlos High School. He attended the College of San Mateo and spearheaded the comedy duo "Proops & Brakeman". Later, he took courses in improvisation and acting at San Francisco State University, though he never finished college.

Career

Improv comedy
After college, he joined an improv group with Mike McShane. Both Proops and McShane impressed producers Dan Patterson and Mark Leveson, who put them on their show, Whose Line Is It Anyway?. He frequently instigated jokes concerning various idiosyncrasies and differences between British English and American English, and would frequently banter with Clive Anderson on these matters (among others). He lived in London for four years when he was doing the show and lists McShane, Richard Vranch and Colin Mochrie among his best friends. After the show ended, he was recalled for the American version and has been a frequent "fourth contestant". Through 2020, he has appeared in 74 U.S. Whose Line episodes, more than any other non-regular cast member.

Proops also appeared in every episode of the short-lived Drew Carey's Green Screen Show, where the performers would play improv games (some of which were taken from the show's main influence Whose Line Is It Anyway?) in front of a massive green screen. Later, animators would draw on the background and other props. In April 2011, Drew Carey's Improv-A-Ganza premiered on GSN featuring Proops along with other frequent guests from Whose Line is it Anyway? In July 2012, Proops appeared in ABC's improvisation show, Trust Us with Your Life.

In November 2011, Proops did a week on Royal Caribbean's Freedom of the Seas with the Lewis Black Comedy Cruise Tour. He performed the entire week of stand-up with other artists, which included a live, one-hour podcast in front of his entire audience.

Film and television
Proops has performed his stand-up act across Britain, mainland Europe, Australia and New Zealand. His other credits include hosting Space Cadets, a mid-1990s science-fiction comedy game show on Channel 4 in the UK, which also featured Craig Charles (Dave Lister from Red Dwarf) and Bill Bailey, and appearances on BBC2's Mock the Week. He appeared as a panelist on the 2000 revival of To Tell the Truth. Proops has also hosted game shows, including VS. in 1999, Rendez-View in 2001, and Head Games, a Science Channel game show which ran for one season in 2009. Proops also competed on the November 8th, 1984 episode of Jeopardy!, losing to eventual five day champion John Genova. He would later record video clues for two Jeopardy! episodes in 2000 & 2001.

In addition to his stand-up and improv acts, Proops has done voice work in various films and TV shows, including Tim Burton's The Nightmare Before Christmas, and the miniseries Stripperella with Pamela Anderson.  Proops provided the voice of Bob in the US version of the TV series Bob the Builder for the five seasons of Project Build It. He has also featured in 2003 film Brother Bear as the voice of one of the Love Bears and provided the voice as Cryptograf in 2006 film Asterix and the Vikings.

Proops has been involved with Turner Classic Movies since 2013, appearing on several of the network's podcasts and in person at public events. In 2016, he appeared as a television presenter for TCM, introducing comedy films by the Marx Brothers and Wheeler & Woolsey.

Proops has been involved with the Star Wars franchise as well. He played the role of Fode in Star Wars: Episode I – The Phantom Menace. He would later work with the Expanded Universe, reprising his role as Fode in the video game Star Wars Episode I: Racer and the video game adaptation of Star Wars Episode I: The Phantom Menace, and he guest-starred on two episodes of the animated series Star Wars: The Clone Wars ("The Mandalore Plot" and "Voyage of Temptation") as Tal Merrick. In 2018, Proops voiced Jak Sivrak in Star Wars Resistance.

Proops appeared as a guest on The George Lucas Talk Show during their May the AR Be LI$$ You Arli$$ marathon fundraiser.

Radio and podcast

Since 2010, Proops has hosted a podcast called The Smartest Man In The World, often together with his wife Jennifer Canaga, in which he talks about current events, celebrity culture, and his personal life, usually in front of a live audience. Before Smartest Man, Proops hosted a podcast called The Greg Proops Experiment.

From 1995 to 1996, Proops presented Bits from Last Week's Radio on BBC Radio 1. He did voice work for the BBC Radio 2 series Flight of the Conchords, first broadcast in September 2005. Proops also played the title role in BBC Radio 4's sci-fi comedy series Seymour the Fractal Cat.

Proops provided the voices for the Harlequin Demon, the Devil, and the Sax Player in Tim Burton's The Nightmare Before Christmas soundtrack and movie.

Video games
Proops provides voice-over work as Howard "Buckshot" Holmes, a game show announcer along with John DiMaggio for the Nintendo Wii game MadWorld. DiMaggio and Proops play as comical announcers on a brutal game show set in the future.

Proops provided the voice of Matthew Black, a reporter in the forgotten Psygnosis game, ZombieVille (1997).

Proops also provided the voice of Fargus, a pyromantic court jester for the PlayStation Pandemonium game series.

He later worked as a voice actor in Skylanders: Imaginators, where he voiced a Brain that was freed by Kaos in order to help perfect his Doomlanders project.

Comedy albums
 Live (1994)
 Back in the UK (1997)
 Joke Book (2006)
 Houston, We Have a Problem (2007)
 Elsewhere (2009)
 Greg Proops Digs In! (2010)
 In the Ball Park (2015)
 The Resistance (2018)
 In The City (2022)

Comedy specials
 Greg Proops: Live At Musso & Frank (2013)

The Smartest Book in the World 
On May 5, 2015, Proops released nonfiction book The Smartest Book in the World through publisher Touchstone. The book is based in part on Proops's weekly podcast The Smartest Man in the World, detailing the author's movie and poetry recommendations, baseball facts, powerful women, and misconstrued history. The paperback version of the book was released from Touchstone on February 21, 2017.

Filmography

Film

Television

Video games

Web series

References

External links

 
 
 The Smartest Man in the World Podcast

1959 births
Living people
20th-century American comedians
21st-century American comedians
American game show hosts
American male television actors
American male video game actors
American male voice actors
American podcasters
American stand-up comedians
Comedians from California
Male actors from California
Male feminists
People from San Carlos, California
San Francisco State University alumni
Stand Up! Records artists